The Wintringham Baronetcy, of Dover Street, St George's Hanover Square, in the County of London, was a title in the Baronetage of Great Britain. It was created on 7 November 1774 for Clifton Wintringham, Physician-in-Ordinary to George III, with remainder to Gervase Clifton, son of Sir Gervase Clifton, 6th Baronet, of Clifton (see Clifton baronets). Wintringham outlived Clifton and the title became extinct on his death in 1794.

Wintringham baronets, of Dover Street (1774)

Sir Clifton Wintringham, 1st Baronet (–1794)

See also
Clifton baronets

References

Extinct baronetcies in the Baronetage of Great Britain
Baronetcies created with special remainders